The Essentials may refer to:

 The Essentials (band), a Canadian a cappella group 1993–2011
 The Essentials (TV program), an American program on Turner Classic Movies

Albums
 The Essentials (Alice Cooper album), 2002
 The Essentials (Bananarama album), 2002
 The Essentials (The Cars album), 2005
 The Essentials (Harry Chapin album), 2002
 The Essentials (Ice Cube album), 2008
 The Essentials (Jack Johnson album), 2018
 The Essentials (Laura Branigan album), 2002
 The Essentials (Patrice Rushen album), 2002
 The Essentials (Twisted Sister album), 2002
 The Essentials, by Devo, 2002
 The Essentials, by Little Feat, 2005

See also
Essential (disambiguation)
The Essential (disambiguation)